Nicholas Thomas Ingolia (born February 5, 1979) is an American molecular biologist and assistant professor at University of California, Berkeley. He is most known for the development of the method of ribosome profiling. He has also studied the evolution of heat-sensing nerves in vampire bats and the encoding of small peptides by brief open reading frames. Ingolia is a 2011 Searle Scholar and serves on a peer-review committee for the American Cancer Society.

References

1979 births
Living people
People from San Francisco
University of California, San Francisco alumni
University of California, Berkeley College of Letters and Science faculty
American molecular biologists